Ian Wood may refer to:

 Sir Ian Wood (businessman) (born 1942), chairman of Wood Group, a United Kingdom engineering business
 Ian Wood (politician) (1901–1992), Australian politician
 Ian Wood (footballer, born 1948), English footballer for Oldham Athletic and San Jose Earthquakes 
 Ian Wood (footballer, born 1958), English footballer for Aldershot and Mansfield Town
 Ian N. Wood, British historian
 Ian Wood, the perpetrator of the Ughill Hall shootings